No5 Barristers' Chambers is one of the largest sets of barristers' chambers in the United Kingdom, located in Birmingham, with offices in London, Bristol and Leicester.

Locations
No5 Barristers' Chambers' hub is in central Birmingham, at Fountain Court, Steelhouse Lane. The second office is located in Savoy Court, near the Strand in the City of London. The third office is in Queen Square, in Bristol city centre. The fourth office is in Provincial House, Leicester.

Members 
Over 260 barristers are listed at No5 Barristers' Chambers, including 37 of the King's Counsel, colloquially referenced as "silks", practising across all areas of law.

No5 Barristers' Chambers has expertise across the full spectrum of law including Business and Property, Clinical Negligence, Costs and Litigation Funding, Court of Protection, Credit  Hire, Crime, Education Law, Employment, Family, Immigration, Asylum and Nationality, Inquests, Public Inquiries and Coronial Law, International Human Rights, Mediation & Alternative Dispute Resolution, Personal Injury, Planning and Environment, Prison and Police Law, Public Law and Regulatory.

The current Heads of Chambers are Adrian Keeling KC and Jonathan Jones KC; who succeeded Mark Anderson KC in 2021. Heads of Groups include Richard Kimblin KC, Peter Goatley KC, Mark Heywood KC, Mohammad Zaman KC, Henry Pitchers KC, Danny Bazini, Mugni Islam-Choudhury and Richard Hadley who along with many other members of chambers, each of whom are noted for their work by both The Legal 500 and Chambers and Partners.

References

External links

Barristers' chambers in the United Kingdom
Law firms of England
Companies based in Birmingham, West Midlands